The Secretary of State for Commonwealth Affairs was a British Cabinet minister responsible for dealing with the United Kingdom's relations with members of the Commonwealth of Nations (its former colonies). The minister's department was the Commonwealth Office.

The position was created on 1 August 1966 by the merger of the old positions of Secretary of State for Commonwealth Relations and Secretary of State for the Colonies. In 1968 the position was merged with that of Secretary of State for Foreign Affairs to create the new position of Secretary of State for Foreign and Commonwealth Affairs.

Secretaries of State for Commonwealth Affairs, 1966–1968

Commonwealth Affairs
Defunct ministerial offices in the United Kingdom
1966 establishments in the United Kingdom
1968 disestablishments in the United Kingdom
1960s in the United Kingdom
Ministries established in 1966